Sol Duc Hot Springs is a resort located in Olympic National Park, Washington state, that is best known for its soaking pools, hot tubs, and a swimming pool that are heated with the nearby hot springs.  The resort is situated in a valley carved by the Sol Duc River.

The springs, known to local Native American tribes for their therapeutic value, first came to the attention of settlers in the 1880s.  An elaborate resort opened up in 1912, and was characterized as "the most noted pleasure and health resort on the
Pacific Coast" until it burned down in 1916.  The resort was rebuilt on a much less grand scale in the 1920s, and was operated into the 1970s until it ran into trouble with its thermal spring in the 1970s. These problems were overcome, and the resort was rebuilt in the 1980s. It continues to operate until this day, attracting thousands of visitors a year.  Also located in the area is the undeveloped Olympic Hot Springs.

References

External links

Wild beauty of the Sol Duc valley is therapeutic any time of year
Official website for Sol Duc Hot Springs

Buildings and structures in Clallam County, Washington
Hot springs of Washington (state)
Landforms of Olympic National Park
Tourist attractions in Clallam County, Washington
Bodies of water of Clallam County, Washington